Günter Kronsteiner (born 14 September 1953) is an Austrian former footballer who was most recently head coach of the Fort Lauderdale Strikers in the American North American Soccer League, currently manager of Slovak 1. FC Tatran Prešov

Playing career
During his playing career, Kronsteiner played as a midfielder with DSV Leoben, Wacker Innsbruck, Red Bull Salzburg, LASK Linz, and Rapid Lienz. While with Wacker, he won two Austrian Bundesliga titles and participated in the UEFA Cup.

Post playing career
After his playing days were over, Kronsteiner spent the majority of his time as a Director of Sports for Casino Salzburg, and FK Austria Vienna, where he had worked with and hired reputable names such as Hans Backe and Joachim Löw.

Fort Lauderdale Strikers
On 17 July 2013, it was announced that Kronsteiner had signed as the head coach of the Fort Lauderdale Strikers of the North American Soccer League. Despite leading the Strikers to a surprise Soccer Bowl appearance, the new team ownership announced Kronsteiner would not be returning for 2015.

Kronsteiner rejoined the Strikers as head coach on 30 June 2015. This came after head coach Marcelo Neveleff resigned after nine Spring Season games.

The Fort Lauderdale Strikers didn't want Gunter back the following season. A controversial and prideful figure, the organization and Gunter ended their relationship.

Gunter Kronsteiner is now in Slovakia.

Statistics

Coach
Since 27 July 2013

References

1953 births
Living people
Austrian footballers
Association football midfielders
Austrian Football Bundesliga players
Austrian football managers
DSV Leoben managers
North American Soccer League coaches
Fort Lauderdale Strikers coaches